Christian Cormack (born 1 September 1976 in Hammersmith, London) is a British rowing cox. He competed for the British National Team between 1996 and 2004, winning four medals at the World Rowing Championships including a gold in 2002, two silvers and a bronze medal. In the World Rowing Cup series he won gold in 2001 Munich, silver in 1997 Munich, 1998 Hazewinkel and bronze at 1998 Lucerne and 1999 Lucerne. He retired from rowing after competing at 2004 Athens Olympics.

Cormack also coxed the winning Cambridge eight in the Boat Race in 2001. His crews won the Prince Philip Challenge Cup at Henley Royal Regatta in 2003, and won the Head of the River Race five times – in 1999 and 2000 for Queen's Tower, and 2002, 2003 and 2005 for Leander Club.

See also
 List of Cambridge University Boat Race crews

References 
 
 
 2001 Boat Race

1976 births
Living people
English male rowers
British male rowers
People from Hammersmith
Rowers at the 2004 Summer Olympics
Coxswains (rowing)
Olympic rowers of Great Britain
Alumni of St Edmund's College, Cambridge
World Rowing Championships medalists for Great Britain